Euparyphasma obscura is a moth in the family Drepanidae. It is found in Yunnan in China and in Vietnam.

References

Moths described in 1941
Thyatirinae